Arvind Varma (13 October 1947 – 14 July 2019) was the R. Games Slayter Distinguished Professor, School of Chemical Engineering at Purdue University. His research interests are in chemical and catalytic reaction engineering, and new energy sources.

Education and work
Varma served as the R. Games Slayter Distinguished Professor and Head, School of Chemical Engineering at Purdue University from January 2004 until June 2016 - he was named Jay and Cynthia Ihlenfeld Head in 2012.  Prior to joining Purdue, he was the Arthur J. Schmitt Professor of Chemical Engineering and Director of the Center for Molecularly Engineered Materials at the University of Notre Dame. A native of India, he received all his degrees in Chemical Engineering:  B.S. from UICET, Panjab University (1966), M.S. from the University of New Brunswick (1968) and Ph.D. degree from the University of Minnesota (1972). He remained at Minnesota for one year as an assistant professor, and was a senior research engineer with Union Carbide Corporation for two years before joining the Notre Dame faculty in 1975. He achieved the rank of full Professor in 1980, received the Schmitt Chair position in 1988, and was named founding Director of the Center for Molecularly Engineered Materials in the year 2000.

Varma's research interests were in chemical and catalytic reaction engineering, and new energy sources. He published more than 275 archival journal research papers in these areas, and co-authored three books (Mathematical Methods in Chemical Engineering, Oxford University Press, 1997; Parametric Sensitivity in Chemical Systems, Cambridge University Press, 1999; Catalyst Design: Optimal Distribution of Catalyst in Pellets, Reactors and Membranes, Cambridge University Press, 2001) and co-edited two books. As a mentor, Varma has directed 41 completed Ph.D. dissertations, and the research of 26 post-doctoral research associates. He organized and chaired numerous technical sessions at professional society meetings, and served as Chair of ISCRE-18 held in June 2004. He also served on many national-level committees, including service as founding Director of the AIChE Catalysis and Reaction Engineering Division (1996–98) and member of the AIChE Awards Committee (1994–99). He was a member of AIChE's International Committee, Chair of the Awards Committee, I&EC Division-ACS, and also Chair of the Engineering Research Council Awards Committee, ASEE. He was the founding Editor of the Cambridge Series in Chemical Engineering, a series of textbooks and monographs published by the Cambridge University Press.

Varma served as department chair at Notre Dame during 1982–1988. He held Visiting Professorships at a number of institutions, including Caltech (Chevron Visiting professor), Princeton, University of Wisconsin, University of Minnesota (Piercy Distinguished Visiting professor), Univ of Cagliari, Italy (Visiting Chair Professor), IIT-Kanpur and Institute of Chemical Technology-Mumbai (Kane Visiting professor; Golden Jubilee Fellow; Tilak Visiting Fellow).

Fellowships, honors and recognitions
 Indo-American Fellowship, Fulbright Scholar Award, 1988–89 
 College of Engineering Teacher of the Year Award, Univ. of Notre Dame, 1991 
 Special Presidential Award, Univ. of Notre Dame, 1992
 R.H. Wilhelm Award, AIChE, 1993
 Series Editor, Cambridge Series in Chemical Engineering, 1996–present
 Burns Graduate School Award, Univ. of Notre Dame, 1997
 Ernest W. Thiele Award, AIChE (Chicago section), 1998 
 Chemical Engineering Lectureship Award, ASEE, 2000 
 Research Achievement Award (Inaugural), Univ. of Notre Dame, 2001 
 Honorary Fellow (Inaugural batch), Indian Institute of Chem. Engineers, 2001 
 Technologies of the Year (one of five), Industry Week, 2005 
 Honoree, 60th Birthday sessions - I & II, AIChE Annual Meeting, 2007
 Distinguished ChE Alumnus (Inaugural batch of 3), Panjab University, 2008
 Distinguished University Alumnus, Panjab University, 2008
 Fellow, AIChE, 2008
 Honoree, Festschrift issue, [Industrial & Engineering Chemistry Research|I&EC Research] (Volume 47, No. 23), 2008
 Elected Foreign Member, Academy of Engineering, Mexico, 2010
 Fellow, American Association for the Advancement of Science, 2011 
 Fellow, Industrial & Engineering Chemistry Division, American Chemical Society, 2011
 Leadership Award, College of Engineering, Purdue University, 2011
 Warren K. Lewis Award, AIChE, 2013

Illness and death
Varma was first diagnosed with pancreatic cancer in November 2015. He died on 14 July 2019. He was 71 years old.

Books
 Mathematical Methods in Chemical Engineering, A. Varma and M. Morbidelli, 690 + xvi pages, Oxford University Press, New York, 1997.
 Parametric Sensitivity in Chemical Systems, A. Varma, M. Morbidelli and H. Wu, 342 + xvi pages, Cambridge University Press, Cambridge, U.K., 1999; paperback 2005.
 Catalyst Design: Optimal Distribution of Catalyst in Pellets, Reactors and Membranes, M. Morbidelli, A. Gavriilidis and A. Varma, Cambridge University Press, Cambridge, U.K., 2001; paperback 2005.
 The Mathematical Understanding of Chemical Engineering Systems: Selected Papers of N. R. Amundson, R. Aris and A. Varma (Editors), Pergamon Press, 829 pages, 1980.
 Chemical Reaction and Reactor Engineering, J. J. Carberry and A. Varma (Editors), Marcel Dekker, 1069 pages, 1987.

References

External links
 Arvind Varma - Purdue University
 Arvind Varma - Educator, Researcher and Leader (I&EC Res., 2008)
 Arvind Varma - ChE Educator (CEE, 1998)

University of Minnesota College of Science and Engineering alumni
2019 deaths
1947 births
People from Firozabad
Purdue University faculty
University of Notre Dame faculty
American chemical engineers
Fellows of the American Association for the Advancement of Science
Indian emigrants to the United States
Minnesota CEMS